Petrolex Oil & Gas Limited is a Nigerian company and part of Petrolex Group, an African integrated energy conglomerate. The company was founded in February 2007 by Segun Adebutu, a Nigerian entrepreneur. It  provides services to the oil and gas industry.  It is mainly involved in the refining, storage, distribution and retail of petroleum products in Nigeria and Africa. Petrolex is best known for starting in December 2017, the construction of a 3.6 billion dollar high capacity refinery and Sub-Saharan Africa’s largest tank farm as part of  its Mega Oil City project  in Ogun State, Nigeria.

Background

Petrolex CEO,  Adebutu  started an oil and fuel trading business around 2005 but showed interest in “mid-stream infrastructure” for $330 million.  His experience in family business, laid the foundation for new ideas in his business career. Over the years, Adebutu was involved in bold projects including oil and gas, solid minerals, construction and maritime. This background inspired Adebutu to replicate similar practices with his new initiative Petrolex Oil & Gas Ltd.

In December 2017, Petrolex announced its plan to build a $3.6 billion refinery plant with an output capacity of 250,000 barrels a day. The company is currently working on the “front-end engineering design” and will complete construction in 2021. This initiative is part of a larger Government program to end petroleum products imports in two years.

With support from partners, Petrolex Group has invested over $330 million in the Ibefun tank farm with a 600,000 million litres monthly capacity. The farm was commissioned by the Vice President of Nigeria  Yemi Osinbajo, as part of phase one of a 10-year expansion program. This phase would ease the Apapa and Ibafon tanker traffic gridlock, a source of anxiety for stakeholders.

Petrolex Mega Oil City project

Petrolex provides services in refining, storage, distribution and retailing of petroleum products. The company intends to be listed on the Nigerian Stock Exchange in the coming decade. The company launched the planning, design and development of the Petrolex Mega Oil City in Ibefun, Ogun State in  2012.  The complex spreads over 101 square kilometres, about 10 percent the size of Lagos State. It houses a residential estate for staff, an army barracks, 30 loading gantries for product disbursement, and a 4,000 truck capacity trailer park with accommodation for drivers. The Oil City project is the original idea of Segun Adebutu, CEO of Petrolex and son of the Nigerian entrepreneur Sir Kesington Adebutu. Its goal is to create the largest petrochemical industrial estate in Sub-Saharan Africa. Upon completion, this estate will include a large capacity refinery, a tank farm, a liquefied petroleum gas processing plant, a lubricant facility and  raw material industries (ex. fertiliser plants).  The company has also negotiated the addition of 12,000 acres to expand the Oil City.

Operations overview

Downstream operations

Petrolex downstream operations include the processing of petroleum products, the supply and distribution of gas oil, kerosene; and the retail marketing of specific oil products. Petrolex has built a storage-tank farm and other “mid-stream infrastructure” for $330 million.  The company is connecting its infrastructure to the Nigeria System 2B pipeline at Mosimi to support supply and distribution of petroleum products around the country. This infrastructure includes a procurement of barges,  tug boats and a daughter vessel.

References

External links

  Petrolex official website

Petroleum industry
Oil and gas companies of Nigeria
Companies based in Lagos
2007 establishments in Nigeria
Energy companies established in 2007
Non-renewable resource companies established in 2007